Vehicle Information and Communication System (VICS) is a technology used in Japan for delivering traffic and travel information to road vehicle drivers. It provides simple maps showing information about traffic jams, travel time, and road work - usually relevant to your location and usually incorporating infrared beacons.

It can be compared with the European TMC technology.

VICS is transmitted using:
 FM multiplex broadcasting (uses DARC). With this method, you have to manually select road conditions on-screen.
 Infrared beacons over Japan's highways and urban roads. With this method, road conditions automatically pop up.
 Microwaves in the ISM band.

It is an application of ITS.

The VICS information can be displayed on the car navigation unit at 3 levels:

 Level-1: Simple text data
 Level-2: In form of simple diagrams
 Level-3: Data superimposed on the map displayed on navigation unit (e.g., traffic congestion data)

Information transmitted generally includes traffic congestion data, data on availability of service areas (SA) and parking areas (PA), information on road works and traffic collisions.

Some advanced navigation units might utilize this data for route calculation (e.g., choosing a route to avoid congestion) or the driver might use his/her own discretion while using this information.

See also
G-Book
Internavi
CarWings

External links
 VICS official website

Information systems
Warning systems
Road transport in Japan
Intelligent transportation systems
Japanese inventions